Georgia Hubley is an American percussionist, vocalist, and visual artist. She is one of the two founding members of the indie rock band Yo La Tengo, and is married to the group's other founding member, guitarist/vocalist Ira Kaplan, with whom she lives in New Jersey. The two would often see each other in record shops and at the same shows. Finding a common ground in music, and sharing a love of New York Mets baseball, they began hanging out and jamming together. They formed the band in 1984, and released their first album, Ride the Tiger, in 1986 on the Coyote label.

In addition to being the drummer and vocalist, Hubley has designed covers for the band's releases. She also plays occasional guitar, keyboard, and drum machine on the band's recordings.

Hubley is a daughter of UPA Studios animators John Hubley and Faith Elliott Hubley, and a sister of Emily Hubley.

References

External links

Yo La Tengo's site

American percussionists
Living people
Yo La Tengo members
American rock drummers
American women drummers
1960 births
Place of birth missing (living people)
20th-century American drummers
20th-century American women musicians